Herman Lindqvist (born 1 April 1943 in Stockholm) is a Swedish journalist who has served as foreign correspondent in many countries and authored a number of popular books on Swedish history. In particular his multiple-volume Historien om Sverige (1992–2002) has become very popular, but has also drawn criticism for allegedly lacking historical accuracy.

References 

1943 births
Living people
Swedish journalists
20th-century Swedish historians
Swedish monarchists
21st-century Swedish historians